Freddy Fernández may refer to:

 Freddy Fernández (actor) (1934–1995), Mexican actor
 Freddy Fernández (footballer) (born 1974), Costa Rican footballer